August Enna (13 May 1859 – 3 August 1939) was a Danish composer, known mainly for his operas.

Enna was born in Nakskov, Lolland, Denmark, but his ethnic origins lay in Sicily.  His first major success as a composer was The Witch (1892), which was followed by several popular operas, songs, two symphonies (in D minor and E major), and a violin concerto.  Strongly influenced by Wagner's music, he was himself an influence on Danish composers, such as Carl Nielsen.

August Enna also wrote piano music.

Selected works
Kleopatra - opera in Danish, 1895
Den lille Pige med Svovlstikkerne - one-act opera in Danish

References

External links
 
 Heksen: opera i fire akten, 1891 publication, digitized by BYU on archive.org

Danish classical composers
Danish male classical composers
1859 births
1939 deaths
Danish people of Italian descent
Danish opera composers
Male opera composers
People from Nakskov